The 1916 Cumberland vs. Georgia Tech football game was played on October 7, 1916, between the Cumberland College Bulldogs and the Georgia Tech Engineers on the Engineers' home field of Grant Field in Atlanta. Georgia Tech defeated the Bulldogs 222–0 for the most lopsided score in the history of college American football.

Cumberland had disbanded its football program the previous year but was still obligated to play this game against Georgia Tech. The Engineers' head coach, John Heisman, had been the coach of Georgia Tech's baseball team when it was defeated 22–0 by the Bulldogs earlier in 1916, and was looking to avenge that game. Heisman insisted that the Bulldogs fulfill their obligations to play the game and threatened legal action if Cumberland backed out. Cumberland tasked George E. Allen, its baseball captain, to assemble a football team for the game; he recruited his fraternity brothers and students from Cumberland's law school to play in Atlanta.

Despite receiving the opening kickoff, Cumberland never achieved a first down in the entire match and opted to punt on multiple possessions; the game's infamous score can be partially attributed to 97 percent of the game's plays occurring in Cumberland territory, with 64 of those plays occurring in its red zone. Georgia Tech, instigated by Heisman, scored on every first down it gained. The imbalance of the teams was so severe that the final two quarters were shortened from their customary 15 minutes to 12 minutes.

This would be the last matchup of any sport between the two schools; Cumberland deemphasized athletics in favor of academic pursuits, while Georgia Tech has continued to compete at the highest level of college sports. Current National Collegiate Athletics Association (NCAA) rules preclude a rematch of this game. After World War II, it became regarded as unsportsmanlike to deliberately run up the score to such high numbers, meaning that college football games of more than 100 points have been infrequent since the 1940s.

Background
Cumberland College, a Presbyterian school in Lebanon, Tennessee, had discontinued its football program before the season but was not allowed to cancel its game against the Engineers. The fact that Cumberland's baseball team had crushed Georgia Tech earlier that year 22–0 (amidst allegations that Cumberland used professionals as ringers) probably accounted for Georgia Tech coach John Heisman's running up the score on the Bulldogs, as Heisman was also Georgia Tech's baseball coach. It is speculated that Heisman may have deliberately aimed for a score of exactly 222 as a numerically significant retaliation to Cumberland's 22. He insisted on the schools' scheduling agreement, which required Cumberland to pay $3,000 to Tech if its football team failed to show. In fact, Heisman actually paid Cumberland $500 as an incentive to play the game; his letter to Cumberland's athletic department read in part:

George E. Allen (who was elected to serve as Cumberland's football team student manager after first serving as the baseball team student manager) therefore put together a team of 12–16 players, most of whom were his fraternity brothers or law students, to travel to Atlanta as Cumberland's football team.

Another reason for Heisman's plan to run up the score was the practice among the sportswriters of the time to rank teams based upon how many points they scored.  Since this statistic did not account for the strength or weakness of a team's opponent, Heisman disagreed with the amount of weight the writers tended to assign to it, and he may have unleashed his players on Cumberland to make his point.

The game
Cumberland received the opening kickoff and failed to make a first down. After a punt, the Engineers scored on their first play. Cumberland then fumbled on their next play from the line of scrimmage, and a Georgia Tech player returned the fumble for a touchdown. The Bulldogs fumbled again on their next play, and it took Georgia Tech two rushes to score its third touchdown. Cumberland lost nine yards on its next possession, and Georgia Tech scored a fourth touchdown on another two-play drive.

Georgia Tech led 63–0 after the first quarter and 126–0 at halftime. Georgia Tech added 54 more points in the third quarter and 42 in the final period.  Several players on the heavily-outmatched Cumberland side suffered serious injuries during the game, including quarterback Charles Edwards, who was thrice carted off with concussions.

Georgia Tech scored a total of 32 touchdowns, and Georgia Tech's left end James Preas kicked 18 extra points. Cumberland's only effective defense was an extra point blocked with a sort of human pyramid known as the "climb-the-ladder" play, topped with Vichy Woods, who suffered a gruesome facial injury on the play.  Despite scoring 32 touchdowns, the Engineers did not complete or attempt a forward pass; all their yardage came on rushes, returns or defensive plays.

Several myths have developed around the game. Some have written that Cumberland did not have a single play that gained yards; in fact, its longest play was a 10-yard pass (on 4th-and-22 or 3rd-and-18). The Bulldogs gained positive yardage on at least six plays, though they fumbled on two of them.  One page on Cumberland's website says Georgia Tech scored on every offensive play, but the play-by-play account of the game refutes this and suggests a more likely scenario: that Georgia Tech scored on every one of its sets of downs. Thus, neither team made a first down that was not also a touchdown, as Cumberland made no first downs in the entire game.

Cumberland purportedly committed 15 turnovers—nine fumbles and six interceptions—during the game.

Sportswriter Grantland Rice wrote, "Cumberland's greatest individual play of the game occurred when fullback Allen circled right end for a 6-yard loss." At halftime, Heisman reportedly told his players, "You're doing all right, team, we're ahead. But you just can't tell what those Cumberland players have up their sleeves. They may spring a surprise. Be alert, men! Hit 'em clean, but hit 'em hard!" However, even Heisman relented, and shortened the third and fourth quarters from 15 minutes to 12.

Statistics

These statistics are based on the play-by-play transcript and may be incomplete.

Records 
Prior to the match, the record for a highest score in a football match was a 159–0 score by Newberry against BMI made in 1913, while the highest score in a college game was 144–0 by Florida against Southern also in 1913. In the preceding 45 years of college football, only 36 games had exceeded 100 points, and only seven those were against teams also from a college.

Since World War II, only a handful of schools have topped 100 points in a college football game. The modern-era record for most points scored against a college opponent is 106 by Fort Valley State of Georgia against Knoxville College in 1969. In the previous year Houston defeated Tulsa 100–6 to set the NCAA record in major college football. In 1949 the University of Wyoming defeated University of Northern Colorado 103–0. The Division III football scoring record was set in 1968 when North Park University defeated North Central College 104–32, using ten passing touchdowns along the way.

Legacy
The game ball had the score written on it as a memento. It was donated to the Helms Athletic Foundation sports museum by Bill Schroeder, an avid sports collector. When the museum moved locations in the 1980s, the ball was boxed and remained in storage.

In 2014, Ryan Schneider, a Georgia Tech alumnus, purchased the ball in a charity auction for $40,388 ($33,657 without buyer's premium), with the intention of donating it back to Georgia Tech.

In October 1956, a 40th reunion was held for players from both teams, of whom 28 were able to attend. While reminiscing, one of the Cumberland players pointed out one play that saved Cumberland from an even worse defeat; had Cumberland punted as normal instead of running a sneak, the score would probably have been 229–0.

While Cumberland's football team would eventually be restarted full-time (and change its nickname to the Phoenix in 2016), the two schools have not met in any sports since: Cumberland would eventually de-emphasize athletics, and currently competes in the NAIA, while Georgia Tech would go on to be a founding member of the Southeastern Conference before departing the SEC in 1964, and is currently a member of the Atlantic Coast Conference.

In any case, current NCAA rules only allow Division III schools to compete against NAIA schools.

See also
 List of historically significant college football games
 1992 Troy State vs. DeVry men's basketball game – the highest scoring college basketball game in history

Notes

References

External links 

The Game of the Century at Cumberland University (via archive.org).
GEORGIA TECH 222, CUMBERLAND 0. – 100th anniversary tribute by SB Nation

1916 college football season
vs. Georgia Tech 1916
vs. Cumberland 1916
1916 in sports in Georgia (U.S. state)
October 1916 sports events